Mike Slivinski (born October 31, 1974) is a former U.S. soccer player.

Youth and college
Slivinski, a native of St. Louis, Missouri, grew up immersed in that city's soccer culture.  Beginning playing when he was five, Slivinski became a member of the Scott Gallagher soccer club.  Slivinski attended Francis Howell North High School where he was the 1992–1993 Gatorade Player of the Year for the state of Missouri.
Slivinski attended the University of Virginia where he was a member of the men's soccer team from 1993 to 1996. A forward with blazing speed and electrifying creativity, Slivinski's college career was shattered when he suffered a torn ACL.  Though he recovered from the injury after a year's hiatus, he was never the same.  In 1994, Slivinski was unable to play for the Cavaliers as he was academically ineligible. He received an academic suspension for the 1994 season and was not in school that semester.

Professional career
On March 14, 1998  D.C. United of Major League Soccer (MLS) signed Slivinski as a discovery player.  That season he saw time in nineteen games, but had difficulty finding playing time the next two seasons.  As a result, United loaned him to MLS Pro-40, Hampton Roads Mariners, Northern Virginia Royals, Maryland Mania and San Diego Flash.  United waived him on June 30, 2000 after he played only two games that season.

Slivinski signed with the Milwaukee Rampage of USL First Division for the 2001 season.  He played eight games and scored one goal.

National team
Slivinski was selected for the U.S. team at the 1991 FIFA U-17 World Championship.  The U.S. went 3–0 in the first round, but fell to Qatar in penalty kicks in the second round.

Slivinski earned one cap with the U.S. national team.  On September 14, 1991, he started in a 1–0 victory over Jamaica.  He was 16 years and 10 months old, a record for the youngest player capped by the U.S., a record since eclipsed by Freddy Adu.

References

External links
 Slivinski profile
  American Futbol Academy – St. Peters, Mo. (Mike Slivinski, President and Technical Director)

1974 births
Living people
Soccer players from St. Louis
United States men's international soccer players
Milwaukee Rampage players
San Diego Flash players
Virginia Beach Mariners players
Major League Soccer players
D.C. United players
Parade High School All-Americans (boys' soccer)
Virginia Cavaliers men's soccer players
American soccer players
A-League (1995–2004) players
United States men's youth international soccer players
MLS Pro-40 players
Northern Virginia Royals players
Maryland Mania players
Association football midfielders